Edraianthus (rock bells or grassy bells) is a small genus of  flowering plants in the family Campanulaceae. Edraianthus species are native to mountain regions of the Balkan, including Bosnia, Bulgaria, Croatia, Montenegro and Serbia, and as far as Romania, Italy and Greece.

They are small perennial plants, with tufts of grassy leaves and fine bell-shaped flowers, usually blue. They are often used as ornamental plants in rock gardens.

The genus name is derived from the Greek hedraios (sitting) and anthos (flower).

Selected species

Ten species of the genus Edraianthus are often placed in genus Wahlenbergia instead. Selected Edraianthus species are also placed in Muehlbergella, Halacsyella or Hedraeanthus by some botanists. Campanula parnassica is sometimes classified as Edraianthus parnassica. Also Halacsyella is classed as a synonym of Edraianthus.

References

 Ottawa Valley Rock Garden & Horticultural Society

Campanulaceae genera
Campanuloideae